Dwayne or Duane King may refer to:

D. J. King, Canadian ice hockey player
Dwayne King, character in 30 Minutes or Less
 Dwayne A. King, American politician and businessman
 Duane H. King, American scholar of Native American topics